The Regionalliga Südwest is the fourth tier of the German football league system in the states of Hesse, Baden-Württemberg, Rhineland-Palatinate and Saarland. It is one of five leagues at this level, together with the Regionalliga Bayern, Regionalliga Nordost, Regionalliga Nord and the Regionalliga West.

The league was formed at the end of the 2011–12 season, when the clubs from the Regionalliga Süd, except those from Bavaria, were joined by the clubs of the Regionalliga West from Saarland and Rhineland-Palatinate.

Teams
The following teams played in the 2019–20 season of the Regionalliga Südwest:

 Relegated team of the Südwest area from the 2019–20 3. Liga:
 SG Sonnenhof Großaspach
 Remaining teams from the 2019–20 Regionalliga Südwest:
 TSV Steinbach Haiger
 SV Elversberg
 FC 08 Homburg
 FC Astoria Walldorf
 1. FSV Mainz 05 II
 SSV Ulm 1846
 Kickers Offenbach
 TSG 1899 Hoffenheim II
 FC Bayern Alzenau
 Bahlinger SC
 FSV Frankfurt
 SC Freiburg II
 VfR Aalen
 FC Gießen
 FK Pirmasens
 TSG Balingen
 Rot-Weiß Koblenz
 Champion of the 2019–20 Oberliga Rheinland-Pfalz/Saar:
 TSV Schott Mainz
 the champion of the 2019–20 Oberliga Baden-Württemberg:
 VfB Stuttgart II
 Champion of the 2019–20 Hessenliga:
 KSV Hessen Kassel

Owners and shareholders 
The Regionalliga Südwest is owned by the Regionalliga Südwest GbR. 
The shareholders are a total of nine Football association. These are the seven DFB-German Football Association involved

 Baden Football Association
 Hessian Football Association
 Rhineland Football Association
 Saarland Football Association
 South Baden Football Association
 Southwest German Football Association
 Württemberg Football Association

as well as two DFB-Regionalverbände

 Southern German Football Association
 Southwestern Regional Football Association

History

The German league system had been reformed in 2008, when the 3rd Liga was established and the number of regional leagues increased from two to three. A further alteration was made in 2011. This was prompted by the large number of insolvencies in the fourth tier, caused by high costs and infrastructure requirements while, at the same time, the clubs at this level complained about low incomes and lack of interest from TV broadcasters. Regionalliga stadiums had to have at least 1,000 seats and a separate stand with separate entrance for away spectators; and such requirements were seen as causing excessive financial strain on amateur clubs. Many clubs also struggled to cope with the 400-page long licence application, as they had to rely on volunteers rather than being able to draw on permanent staff.

This led to Oberliga champions sometimes even declining their right to promotion to avoid the financial risks of the Regionalliga, thus breaking a basic principle of German football, that league champions would almost always be promoted.

In October 2010, at a special conference of the German Football Association, the DFB, 223 of the 253 delegates voted for a reform of the league system at the fourth level. The number of Regionalligas was to be expanded to five, with the re-establishment of the Regionalliga Nordost, the formation of the Regionalliga Bayern and a shift of the Regionalliga Süd to the new Regionalliga Süd/Südwest, later renamed Regionalliga Südwest.

The suggestion for the league reform had come from Bavaria, where, in a meeting of the Bavarian top-level amateur clubs at Wendelstein, the financial survival of the leagues and clubs in the current system had been questioned. This meeting resulted in the publication of what was called the Wendelsteiner Anstoß, which demanded a clear demarcation between professional football on the first three tiers of German football and amateur football below that. For this purpose, the paper also demanded a re-establishment of the German amateur football championship as an incentive and goal for top amateur clubs who did not want to turn professional.

With the Regionaliga reform in 2012, the Regionaliga was increased from three to five leagues. Since then, these have been the North, Northeast, West, Southwest and Bavaria leagues. The league is hosted by the Southwestern Regional Football Association and the Southern German Football Association (with the exception of the Bavarian Football Association). It extends over the federal states of Rhineland-Palatinate, Saarland, Hesse and Baden-Württemberg.

From the 2012/13 to 2017/18 seasons, the champion and the runner-up took part in the Promotion to the 3. Liga. The runner-up was taken into account because six teams were required for the promotion round and because the region of the Regionalliga Südwest, then and now, had the most teams and members of all five regional leagues. For the 2018/19 to 2020/21 seasons, there was a rule that only the champion will be promoted directly to the 3. Liga; there will be no promotion for the runners-up. The relay strength in the 2019/20 season was 18 teams. From the leagues below the Regionalliga Südwest, there are a total of four promoted teams: from the upper leagues of Rhineland-Palatinate/Saar, Hessen and Baden-Württemberg, one team each, usually the champions, is promoted; the three runners-up play to be the fourth promotion.

In 2017, the league signed an agreement to host the China national under-20 football team, allowing the team to compete in the league in friendly matches to fill in as the league's 20th club. The arrangement was only approved by 16 of the 19 clubs in the league, with those in opposition criticising it as part of the increasing commercialisation of football. During the team's match against TSV Schott Mainz, the display of a Tibetan flag led to the team walking off in protest. Consequently, the Chinese players were recalled and the agreement was abrogated.

Founding Members 2012/13
SG Sonnenhof Großaspach, Eintracht Frankfurt II, Eintracht Trier, Wormatia Worms, TSG 1899 Hoffenheim II, 1. FC Kaiserslautern II, SC Freiburg II, 1. FSV Mainz 05 II, KSV Hessen Kassel, SV Elversberg, SV Waldhof Mannheim, SC 07 Idar-Oberstein, SC Pfullendorf, TuS Koblenz, FSV Frankfurt II, FC Bayern Alzenau, SSV Ulm 1846, 1. FC Eschborn, FC 08 Homburg

Rules & regulations

Promotion to the 3rd Liga
The league champions of the five new regional leagues no longer have the right to direct promotion to the 3rd Liga. Instead, the five league winners and the runners-up of the Süd/Südwest would play-off for three promotion spots. The play-offs are played in home-and-away format, and the two clubs from the Süd/Südwest region can not be paired against each other.

As four teams were relegated from the 3rd Liga at the end of the 2018–19 season, the Regionalliga Südwest champions Waldhof Mannheim, along with their counterparts from the Nordost and West, were promoted directly to the league. In 2020, the three direct promotion spots will go to the Südwest champions and the champions of the two leagues that participated in the promotion play-off in the previous season, while the champions of the Nordost and the West participate in the play-off. This format was initially installed as a temporary solution until the DFB-Bundestag in September 2019 decided on a format that could have enabled all Regionalliga champions to be promoted. On that date, the Bundestag delegates voted to grant the Südwest and West champions two direct promotions indefinitely starting in 2021. A third direct promotion place will be assigned according to a rotation principle among the Regionalliga Nord, Nordost and Bayern champions. The representatives from the remaining two Regionalligen will determine the fourth promoted club in two-legged playoffs.

Qualifying
The new league was nominally going to have 18 clubs; however, in its first, transitional season the DFB permitted up to 22 clubs in the league. Restrictions existed on reserve sides. No more than seven reserve teams were permitted per Regionalliga; should there be more in a league the additional ones would have to be moved to a different Regionalliga. Reserve teams of 3rd Liga clubs are not permitted to play in the Regionalliga. The make up of the clubs entering the new Regionalligas from the leagues below was left to the regional football association and not regulated by the DFB.

One exception to the rule was the Bavarian club FC Bayern Alzenau, who had traditionally played in Hesse's league system. This club would participate in the new Regionalliga Südwest, at their own request, rather than in the Regionalliga Bayern.

19 clubs qualified to play in the league's first season (2012–13):
 From the Regionalliga Süd: FC Bayern Alzenau, SC Freiburg II, Eintracht Frankfurt II, FSV Frankfurt II, Sonnenhof Großaspach, TSG 1899 Hoffenheim II, KSV Hessen Kassel, Waldhof Mannheim, SC Pfullendorf, Wormatia Worms
 From the Regionalliga West: Eintracht Trier, SV Elversberg, SC Idar-Oberstein, 1. FC Kaiserslautern II, TuS Koblenz, 1. FSV Mainz 05 II
 Promoted from the Oberligas: 1. FC Eschborn, FC 08 Homburg, SSV Ulm 1846

Champions & runners-up
The league champions and runners-up:

 Promoted teams in bold.
1 SC Freiburg II did not apply for a 3. Liga licence and was replaced by third placed 1. FSV Mainz 05 II in the promotion round, which Mainz completed successfully.

Record

Most Points in a Season
 SV Waldhof Mannheim – 88 (2018/19)
 1. FC Saarbrücken – 82 (2017/18)
 Kickers Offenbach – 79 (2014/15)
 SV Elversberg – 78 (2016/17)
 SG Sonnenhof Großaspach – 75 (2013/14)

Players with the Most Playing Time
Stand: end of the 2019/20 season

Player with the Most Goals
Stand: End of the 2019/20 season

Championship Titles

Logo
The logo of the Regionalliga Südwest, which was introduced in 2012, shows a football player wo is oriented towards the southwest. The seven blue stars symbolize the regional associations involved, the two white stars stand for the regional associations SFV and FRVS.

League statistics
The top goal scorers and spectator statistics for the league are:

Placings in the Regionalliga Südwest
Final league positions of all clubs who have played in the league:

 1 At the end of the 2013–14 season Eintracht Frankfurt decided to withdraw its reserve side from all competitions after a ruling by the DFL allowed all Bundesliga and 2. Bundesliga clubs to freely choose whether or not to operate an under-23 reserve team. Previous to that such teams had been compulsory.
 2 SSV Ulm 1846 declared insolvent at the end of the 2013–14 season and was relegated.

Key

References

Sources
 Deutschlands Fußball in Zahlen,  An annual publication with tables and results from the Bundesliga to Verbandsliga/Landesliga. DSFS.
 Kicker Almanach,  The yearbook on German football from Bundesliga to Oberliga, since 1937. Kicker Sports Magazine.

External links 
 Official DFB web site on Regionalliga football
 Football results and tables from Germany
 Das deutsche Fussball Archiv  Historic German league tables

Sud Sudwest
Football competitions in Saarland
Football competitions in Rhineland-Palatinate
Football competitions in Baden-Württemberg
Football competitions in Hesse
2012 establishments in Germany
Sports leagues established in 2012